Prana Studios, Inc. was an Indian-American computer animation and visual effects company, founded in 2005 in Los Angeles, United States, with a wholly owned subsidiary in Mumbai, India.

Prana Studios' investors include Reliance Industries and Mahindra Group.

History
Prana Studios was founded in April 2005 by Arish Fyzee, Kristin Dornig and Pankaj Gunsagar. In 2005, Prana opened its Mumbai office.

In 2008, The Weinstein Company launched a series of direct-to-video CG feature-length films called Unstable Fables - they were produced amongst others, by The Jim Henson Company and Prana Studios. The first released was 3 Pigs and a Baby, the second released was Tortoise vs. Hare and third and final released was The Goldilocks and the 3 Bears Show.

Prana produces stories and CG imagery for US domestic, international and Indian domestic Bollywood markets, including Kuch Kuch Hota Hai for Dharma Productions, as well as the French animated film Why I Did (Not) Eat My Father.

On March 29, 2013, Prana Studios affiliate 34x118 Holdings, LLC won the bidding of Rhythm and Hues Studios in a bankruptcy auction against other visual effects/CGI animation studios, Prime Focus and Brave Vision. Another contender, Psyop, was eliminated early in the process. The sale was "valued at about $30 million."

On July 10, 2019, it closed quietly leaving 300 jobless.

Filmography

Feature films

Short films

Television

References

External links
 

Indian animation studios
American animation studios
Visual effects companies
Indian companies established in 2005
Mass media companies established in 2005
Mass media companies disestablished in 2019
Indian companies disestablished in 2019
Film production companies based in Mumbai
2005 establishments in California
2019 disestablishments in California